Bedford High School may refer to:

United Kingdom
Bedford High School, Bedfordshire, in the town of Bedford
Bedford High School, Leigh, Greater Manchester, England

United States
Bedford High School (Iowa)
Bedford High School (Massachusetts)
Bedford High School (New Hampshire)
Bedford High School (Ohio)
Bedford High School (Pennsylvania)
Bedford Senior High School, in Temperance, Michigan

See also 
New Bedford High School, in New Bedford, Massachusetts
Bedford North Lawrence High School, in Bedford, Indiana